Kelli Russell Agodon (born in Seattle) is an American poet, writer, and editor. She is the cofounder of Two Sylvias Press and she serves on the poetry faculty at the Rainier Writing Workshop, a low-residency MFA program at Pacific Lutheran University.

Life
She was raised in Seattle, and graduated from the University of Washington and Pacific Lutheran University Rainier Writing Workshop with an MFA in creative writing. She lives in Washington state.  Her works have appeared in the Atlantic Monthly, American Poetry Review, Prairie Schooner, North American Review, Image, 5 a.m, Meridian, Calyx., poets.org, and The Los Angeles Review.

She lives in the Northwest.
She was the Editor-in-Chief of the Crab Creek Review from 2009 until 2014. She is the co-founder of Two Sylvias Press. She is the Co-Director of the Poets on the Coast: A Weekend Writing Retreat for Women.

Recognition
Her most recent book, Hourglass Museum (White Pine Press, 2014), was a Finalist for the Washington State Book Awards and shortlisted for the Julie Suk Prize in Poetry.

Awards
 2018 Poetry Society of America Lyric Poetry Prize
2015 Centrum Residency Recipient
2009 Artist Trust GAP Grant Recipient
2005 James Hearst Poetry Prize 3rd place
2003 Artist Trust GAP Grant Recipient

Works
"Hunger," Academy of American Poets, Poem-a-Day
"Braided Between the Broken," New England Review
"How Killer Blue Irises Spread," The Atlantic
"Letting Gatsby Out at 11 p.m.," Body Literature
"Sailing Lepidoptera," "The Half-Moon Couple," Adirondack Review
"Dord"; "Unintentionally Typing the Word Life Instead of Lips"; "?", Womb Poetry
"Sometimes I still dream about their pink bodies", Poetry Southeast

Books
 
 
 
Letters From the Emily Dickinson Room, White Pine Press, 2010,

Anthologies

References

External links

Two Sylvias Press

1969 births
Living people
Poets from Washington (state)
American women poets
University of Washington College of Arts and Sciences alumni
Pacific Lutheran University alumni
21st-century American poets
21st-century American women writers